Emakhaya is the debut studio album by South African singer-songwriter Mlindo the Vocalist. It was released on September 21, 2018, by BlaqBoy Music and Sony Music Africa. The album is a mixture of afropop, soul, house and alternative R&B.

Background
After the release of his debut single, "AmaBlesser", in January 2018, Mlindo confirmed that he was working on an album and estimated that it would be released later in 2018. On September 14, he announced the album's title and revealed its cover art as it was made available to pre-order and pre-save on iTunes.

Commercial Performance 
Emakhaya was certified gold in South Africa.

Industry awards 

! 
|-
|rowspan="3"|2019
|rowspan="3"|Emakhaya
| Best Afro Pop Album
| 
|rowspan="3"|
|-
| Best Produced Album 
|
|-
|Newcomer of the Year 
|

Release and promotion
The album launch was held on September 21, 2018, at The Orbit in Braamfontein, Johannesburg.

Singles
"AmaBlesser" was released on January 28, 2018, as the album's lead single. The album reached number-one on the Radiomonitor South Africa, and also was atop on the iTunes Local Single Chart the following day.

"Macala" was released as the second single on October 17, 2019. It also peaked number-one on both Entertainment Monitor Africa and the Radiomonitor South Africa. The single had a major contribution on the album's 45 million streams.

Track listing

Personnel
 Mlindo the Vocalist – vocals
 Sjava – featured artist on vocals 
 Vyno Miller – featured artist on vocals 
 Shwi No Mtekhala – featured artist on vocals 
 Sha Sha – featured artist on vocals 
 Thabsie – featured artist on vocals 
 Kwesta – featured artist on vocals 
 Sfeesoh – featured artist on vocals 
 Rayvanny – featured on vocals 
 DJ Maphorisa – production
 
 Choole Munyati – composition
 Thabo Ngubani – composition
 Bongani Sikhukula – composition
 Howard Goward – composition
 Darlington Chikwewo – composition
 Tshegofatso Teffo - composition
 Tshego AMG - Guitars and Production

References

External links

2018 debut albums